The Blue Trinity are a series of Russian supervillains, created by DC Comics, that debuted in The Flash comic book series in The Flash (vol. 2) # 7 (December 1987). Unlike their successors, the Red Trinity, the members of this team were emotionally unstable and abnormally strong and antagonists in the stories of the Flash.

Fictional story
Two Soviet scientists, Doctors Pytor Orloff and Krulik, were amazed at reports of the American Flash, Barry Allen. Orloff was interested with the benefits such powers would bring to society, whereas Krulik was only interested in the military applications.

They began working on a serum, which Orloff invented first. Krulik, however, was fed up because he consistently used only animal subjects. Krulik wanted to test with human subjects. The Kremlin provided him with three children, but not before Krulik had tested the serum on himself. When he first used his speed, the friction from the air burned him alive.

The three children were Gregor Gregorovich, Boleslaw Uminski, and Christina. Orloff was left to oversee their upbringing. They became Blue Trinity. They were controlled by the army and stationed near Kiev. They were stronger and more loyal to the Soviet Union than their later counterparts, Red Trinity. Blue Trinity was sent to chase the Flash and Red Trinity, who were fleeing the Soviet Union with Dr. Orloff, who was being brought to the United States to help the dying Jerry McGee, but they were defeated. After Orloff had arrived in America, Blue Trinity again was sent by the Soviet government, this time to kill him. After a short battle with Red Trinity, he convinced them to leave in peace. Blue Trinity had been hired by Rudy West to capture the Flash and take him back to the Manhunter's base in Siberia. However, their attempt was foiled by Red Trinity, who appeared at just the right moment.

Blue Trinity was betrayed by the Manhunters and imprisoned, then sold to Vandal Savage. Savage experimented with them, giving them Velocity 9.

Members
 Gregor Gregorovich
 Boleslaw Uminski
 Christina Alexandrova Molotova later became known as Lady Flash and joined the People's Heroes.

References

DC Comics superhero teams
DC Comics supervillain teams
Comics characters introduced in 1987
Fictional Soviet people
Characters created by Mike Baron
Characters created by Jackson Guice
Soviet Union-themed superheroes
Flash (comics) characters